The Torre del Mangia is a tower in Siena, in the Tuscany region of Italy. Built in 1338-1348, it is located in the Piazza del Campo, Siena's main square, next to the Palazzo Pubblico (Town Hall). When built it was one of the tallest secular towers in medieval Italy. At 102 m it is now Italy's second tallest after Cremona Cathedral's Torrazzo, the Asinelli tower in Bologna at 97 m being third.

History 
The tower was built to be exactly the same height as Siena Cathedral as a sign that the church and the state had equal power.

The name refers to its first bellringer, Giovanni di Balduccio, nicknamed Mangiaguadagni (‘Profit eater’) either for his spendthrift tendency, idleness or gluttony.

Sections 

The tower has visually distinct levels, from the bottom:
 a marble loggia at the base
 a long red brick shaft
 a stone section that flares out slightly
 a short pale-gray upper loggia
 a marble (uppermost) structure.

The loggia where the tower meets the Piazza del Campo, known as the Cappella di Piazza, was added in 1352 to fulfil a vow to the Holy Virgin by Sienese survivors of the Black Death. The corner pilasters attained their current form in 1378, the sculptures decorating them being executed in 1378-1382 by Mariano d'Angelo Romanelli e Bartolomeo di Tommé. The simple wooden ceiling once covering the loggia was replaced by the current Renaissance marble vault in 1461-1468 by Antonio Federighi, also responsible for the bizarre decorations of the coronation. In 1537-1539 Il Sodoma painted a fresco above the altar, now housed in the town museum in the Palazzo Pubblico.

The upper-middle part in stone was built by Agostino di Giovanni to the design of one Mastro Lippo pittore, probably identifiable with Lippo Memmi. It consists of a parapet resting on corbels. The pronounced petal-like arches between the corbels have led writers to describe the structure as a tulip or lily.

The clock on the lower part of the shaft was added in 1360. There are three bells, the largest one is called the "Sunto" - an abbreviation of assunto, a reference to the assumption of the Virgin. The bell plays a notable role in the celebrations of the Palio. 

Towers inspired by the Torre del Mangia
A number of towers have been inspired by the Torre del Mangia.  These include:

 The Joseph Chamberlain Memorial Clock Tower (nicknamed Old Joe) at the University of Birmingham, UK, was inspired by the Torre del Mangia, and couples a similar design with Victorian redbrick styles.

 A strongly influenced clock tower built for the Waterbury Union Station in Waterbury, Connecticut.  Designed by McKim, Mead & White and completed in 1909, it today houses the headquarters of the region's daily newspaper.

 The all-granite Pilgrim Monument at Provincetown, Massachusetts is a scaled-down near replica of the Torre del Mangia, but for its materials and height.  Designed by Willard T. Sears, it was built from 1907 to 1910 to commemorate the 21 November 1620 landing of the Mayflower Pilgrims there.  The  monument is the tallest all-granite structure in the United States.

 The Dock Tower in Grimsby, North East Lincolnshire, UK. Although obsolete from 1892 onward, it remains a proud monument to the town and its rich fishing history.

 The tower at the Pine Street Inn at the South End of Boston, Massachusetts, formerly a fire station and fire watch tower, is also modelled on the Torre del Mangia.

 The main building of the Spanish business & law school, ICADE, in Madrid, is topped with a clock tower modelled on  the Torre de Mangia.

See also
 Palio di Siena
 List of tallest structures built before the 20th century

Footnotes

References

Buildings and structures completed in 1348
Towers completed in the 14th century
Mangia
Buildings and structures in Siena
Tourist attractions in Tuscany
Clocks in Italy
1348 establishments in Europe
14th-century establishments in Italy